Malcolm R. McGowan (born 24 October 1955) is a British rower who competed in the 1980 Summer Olympics and in the 1984 Summer Olympics.

He was born in London in 1955 and attended Emanuel School.

In 1980 he was a crew member of the British boat which won the silver medal in the eights event. In 1981, he won a silver medal at the World Rowing Championships in Munich. He finished fifth with the British eight in the 1984 Olympics.

References

External links
 profile

1955 births
Living people
English male rowers
British male rowers
Olympic rowers of Great Britain
Rowers at the 1980 Summer Olympics
Rowers at the 1984 Summer Olympics
Olympic silver medallists for Great Britain
Olympic medalists in rowing
Medalists at the 1980 Summer Olympics
World Rowing Championships medalists for Great Britain